Biała Wieś refers to the following places in Poland:

 Biała Wieś, Greater Poland Voivodeship
 Biała Wieś, Łódź Voivodeship